iOS 4 is the fourth major release of the iOS mobile operating system developed by Apple Inc., being the successor to iPhone OS 3. It was announced at the Apple Special Event on April 8, 2010, and was released on June 21, 2010. iOS 4 is the first iOS version issued under the "iOS" rebranding, dropping the "iPhone OS" naming convention of previous versions. It was succeeded by iOS 5 on October 12, 2011.

iOS 4 introduced folders on the home screen, significantly increasing the number of apps that can be displayed. Support for custom wallpapers was also added, although limited to newer devices due to animation performance requirements. The operating system also added a multitasking feature, letting apps dealing with Internet calling, location and audio playback function in the background, whereas a similar but more restricted "Fast App Switching" technology enabled any app to be left inactive in the background while users switch to other apps. iOS 4 also added a system-wide spell checking feature, enabled iBooks on iPhone, unified the Mail inbox to combine content from different email providers, and introduced both Game Center for social gaming and FaceTime for video calling.

The iOS 4 update introduced performance and battery problems on iPhone 3G devices, with Apple investigating the matter and promising then-upcoming updates. However, the company became the subject of a lawsuit from a unsatisfied customer over the issues. Around the same time, the release of iPhone 4 and its subsequent antenna problems made Apple focus on unsuccessfully attempting to patch the issues with software updates.

This is also the final iOS operating system to have, on iPhones, an iPod app for music and videos; starting with iOS 5, iPhones have the same separate Music and Videos apps as do iPod Touch and iPad models.

Apps

 iBooks
 Game Center
 FaceTime

History
iPhone OS 4 was introduced at the Apple Special Event on April 8, 2010. At the WWDC keynote address on June 7, 2010, it was renamed to iOS 4 in order to be more inclusive to the iPod Touch and iPad.

iOS 4 was officially released on June 21, 2010.

System features

Home screen 
iOS 4 raised the maximum number of home screen apps from 180 to 2,160 due to the addition of folders. These folders would automatically be named based on the containing apps' respective App Store category. The ability to add custom wallpapers to the home screen was also added, though the feature was notably absent from iPhone 3G and the second-generation iPod Touch due to poor performance of icon animations.

Multitasking 
iOS 4 introduced multitasking. The feature allowed users to switch between apps instantly by double-clicking the home button. It was implemented in such a way that did not cause excessive battery drain. Multitasking was limited to apps dealing with Internet calling, location, and audio playback, while a similar "Fast App Switching" technology meant users could leave an app and enter another, with the original app remaining in the background until the user returns. This feature was notably absent from iPhone 3G and the second-generation iPod Touch due to performance issues.

Spell check 
iOS 4 introduced a spell checking feature that underlined misspelled words in red. Tapping on the word would provide a pop-up with a recommended replacement.

Camera 
The Camera app now supports 5x digital zoom.

App features

iBooks 
iOS 4 introduced iPhone and iPod Touch support in iBooks, which was already included on iPad. Though not a default app, it was available through App Store.

Mail 
The Mail app featured a unified inbox on iOS 4, allowing users to see messages from all of their email accounts displayed together in a single inbox. It also gained support for MobileMe e-mail aliases and multiple Exchange accounts for business users.

Game Center 
iOS 4.1 added a new app called Game Center, an online multiplayer social gaming network, which allows users to invite friends to play games and to compare their scores on a leaderboard. It was not available on the iPhone 3G.

FaceTime 
iOS 4 introduced FaceTime, a videotelephony app that uses the device's camera to allow the user to make video calls with other FaceTime users. This feature was absent from the iPhone 3G, second-generation iPod Touch, iPhone 3GS, and third-generation iPod Touch due to the lack of required features, such as a front-facing camera.

Safari 
The Safari mobile web browser on iOS 4 added Bing as a search option in addition to Google and Yahoo!.
Beginning with iOS 4.2.1, specific words or phrases on a page could be searched.

Problems

Performance and battery issues 
iPhone 3G users reported performance and battery issues after upgrading to iOS 4. Apple started an investigation of the matter in July 2010. In November, Apple was sued for the issues, with an unsatisfied customer alleging "violating the Consumer Legal Remedies Act, unfair business practices, and false and deceptive advertising", with further allegations that Apple knew its software would cause problems on older models. Apple never responded to the allegations, but wrote in a reply to another unsatisfied customer in August 2010 that updates were "coming soon".

Alarm clock 

In all versions of iOS 4, the alarm clock in the clock app had a problem in DST when it would go off an hour too early or too late.

Antenna problems 

Upon its release, some iPhone 4 users reported having technical problems with the phone's antennas. Apple attempted to fix the issue in software with iOS 4.0.1, but failed to do so.

Supported devices
The first-generation iPhone and the first-generation iPod Touch cannot run iOS 4 and above due to hardware limitations, though the iPhone 3G did receive iOS 4, despite it having the same processor as the iPhone 2G. This marked the first time Apple dropped support for older devices.

iPhone
iPhone 3G
iPhone 3GS
iPhone 4

iPod Touch
iPod Touch (2nd generation)
iPod Touch (3rd generation)
iPod Touch (4th generation)

iPad
iPad (1st generation)
iPad 2

Apple TV
Apple TV (2nd generation)

Version history

References

External links 
 

4
2010 software
Products introduced in 2010
Mobile operating systems
Tablet operating systems
Proprietary operating systems